The 1944–45 La Liga was the 14th season since its establishment. Barcelona conquered their second title, 15 years after the first one in the inaugural season.

Team locations

Real Gijón made their debut in La Liga.

League table

Results

Relegation play-offs
Since this season, there was only match of the relegation play-offs. It was played at Estadio Metropolitano de Madrid.

|}

Top scorers

External links
 Official LFP Site

1944 1945
1944–45 in Spanish football leagues
Spain